Capuchin College is a national Catholic seminary located in Washington, D.C., owned and administered by the Order of Friars Minor Capuchin.

Built in the early 1900s, it serves as a house of Post-Novitiate training in the United States and belongs to the Capuchin Province of St. Augustine.

The college is located in close proximity to the Catholic University of America, the Basilica of the National Shrine of the Immaculate Conception, the Dominican House of Studies, and Theological College.

Notable alumni
Cardinal Seán Patrick O'Malley - Archbishop of Boston (2003 - Present)
Archbishop Charles J. Chaput - Archbishop of Philadelphia (2011 - 2020)
Bishop John Dennis Corriveau - Capuchin Minister General (1994 - 2006)

References

External links

Capuchin schools
Catholic Church in Washington, D.C.
Order of Friars Minor Capuchin
Catholic seminaries in the United States
Catholic universities and colleges in Washington, D.C.
Seminaries and theological colleges in Washington, D.C.
Private universities and colleges in Washington, D.C.